Super SWIV (Firepower 2000 in the US) is a top-down shoot 'em up released for the Super Nintendo Entertainment System in 1992. It was released as Mega SWIV on the Mega Drive in 1994. It is the sequel to the 1991 game SWIV. It was followed by SWIV 3D in 1996.

The game's story involves a secret underground race on an island in the Atlantic Ocean which has stolen top military vehicles and equipment from around the world and built powerful war machines from them. Military and intelligence officials of major countries detect them, but are afraid that they will be unable to prepare against an assault by this underground race. They send the player character in to infiltrate their base and destroy them.

Players can control either a helicopter or a jeep. The helicopter is not stopped by obstacles but the jeep can fire in any direction. There are nine weapons (five permanent, four short-lasting specials) the player can pick up along the way.

Reception

Super Gamer reviewed the SNES version and gave an overall score of 70% writing: "Another vertical scroller with the addition of simultaneous two-player action. Sadly graphics and gameplay are rather dull and unoriginal." In 1995, Total! rated Super SWIV 72nd on its Top 100 SNES Games writing: "It looks a bit dated but this shooter is brilliantly designed. It’s a two-player jobby too." Glenn Rubenstein of Wizard praised Firepower 2000 being an above average shooter for the snes although he felt that Konomi didn’t put much effort in the graphics or plot.  He commented that the gameplay being heavy on action making it an overall winner concluding: "Should be big with shooter fans, but the general player probably wouldn’t get too into it."

See also
SWIV, a version of the game on various home computer platforms

References

External links
Firepower 2000 at MobyGames

1992 video games
Helicopter video games
Sega Genesis games
Super SWIV
Video game sequels
Video games scored by David Whittaker
Video games developed in the United Kingdom
Vertically scrolling shooters